Maheshtala is a city and a municipality of the South 24 Parganas district in the Indian state of West Bengal. It is situated on the eastern banks of the Hooghly River. It is a part of the area covered by the Kolkata Metropolitan Development Authority (KMDA).

Geography

Area overview
Alipore Sadar subdivision is the most urbanized part of the South 24 Parganas district. 59.85% of the population lives in the urban areas and 40.15% lives in the rural areas. In the northern portion of the subdivision (shown in the map alongside) there are 21 census towns. The entire district is situated in the Ganges Delta and the  subdivision, on the east bank of the Hooghly River, is an alluvial stretch, with industrial development.

Note: The map alongside presents some of the notable locations in the subdivision. All places marked in the map are linked in the larger full screen map.

Location

Rameswarpur, Chata Kalikapur, Ganye Gangadharpur and Asuti form a cluster of census towns on the southern side of Maheshtala, as per the map of the Thakurpukur Maheshtala CD block on the page number 153 in the District Census Handbook 2011 for the South 24 Parganas district.

Climate
Köppen-Geiger climate classification system classifies its climate as tropical wet and dry (Aw).

Demographics

According to the 2011 Census of India, Maheshtala had a total population of 448,317, of which 229,693 were males and 218,624 were females. There were 46,247 people in the age range of 0 to 6 years. The total number of literate people was 329,813, which constituted 73.6% of the population with male literacy of 76.7% and female literacy of 70.3%. The effective literacy (7+) of population over 6 years of age was 82.0%, of which male literacy rate was 85.4% and female literacy rate was 78.5%. The Scheduled Castes and Scheduled Tribes population was 54,645 and 1,934 respectively. Maheshtala had a total of 101,453 households as of 2011.

According to the 2001 Census of India, Maheshtala had a total population of 385,266. Males constitute 53% of the population and females 47%. It has an average literacy rate of 69%, higher than the national average of 59.5%: male literacy is 74%, and female literacy is 63%. 11% of the population is under 6 years of age.

Kolkata Urban Agglomeration
The following municipalities and census towns in the South 24 Parganas district were part of the Kolkata Urban Agglomeration in the 2011 census: Maheshtala (M), Joka (CT), Balarampur (CT), Chata Kalikapur (CT), Budge Budge (M), Nischintapur (CT), Uttar Raypur (CT), Pujali (M) and Rajpur Sonarpur (M).

Civic administration

Municipality
It has jurisdiction over parts of the Maheshtala. It is divided into 35 wards. According to the 2022 municipal election, it is being controlled by the All India Trinamool Congress.

Police stations
Maheshtala and Rabindranagar police stations are located in the Maheshtala municipal area. Both the police stations have jurisdiction over parts of the Maheshtala Municipality, and the Thakurpukur Maheshtala CD block.

Economy
In 2007, a London-based company allied with Bengali NRI to develop a  mini township with the Maheshtala Municipality, for which  had been acquired near Nungi station. There was expected to be 2,240 middle income group flats in 44 buildings and improve the road infrastructure in the area.

Apart from the Calcutta Riverside residential township, Chief Minister Mamata Banerjee had also announced in 2014 that Maheshtala would also get a 1,000-bed hospital to be developed by Apollo Hospitals and real estate major Hiland Group, a film city, sports academy and an international school conceptualized by cricketer Sourav Ganguly.

Transport
Maheshtala is on the Budge Budge Trunk Road.

Santoshpur, Akra and Nangi railway stations are located nearby.

Education
 Maheshtala College, established in 1971, is affiliated with the University of Calcutta. It offers honours courses in Bengali, English, Sanskrit, history, geography, political science, education, philosophy, computer science, mathematics and accountancy and general courses in arts, science and commerce.
 Techno International Batanagar, established in 2012, offers diploma, undergraduate and postgraduate degree courses in Engineering and Technology and other allied fields.

References

External links
 

Cities and towns in South 24 Parganas district
Neighbourhoods in Kolkata
Kolkata Metropolitan Area